Andreas Pipinos (12 March 1788 – 14 December 1836) was a Greek military officer during the Greek War of Independence.

Biography 
Andreas Pipinos was born on the island of Hydra, located in the Aegean Sea between the Myrtoan Sea and the Argolic Gulf. In March 1821, the Greek War of Independence began against the Ottoman Empire. One year later, the Ottoman forces disembarked on the island of Chios, massacred more than  Greek inhabitants, and captured about  who were sold as slaves in Izmir and Istanbul.

After the Chios massacre, the Greek revolutionary government managed to gather a significant amount of money ( kuruş) in order to outfit its ships and attack the Ottoman fleet. At the end of May, the Greek captains from Psara and Hydra decided to burn the Ottoman flagship by using fire ships. Konstantinos Kanaris and Andreas Pipinos took charge of the operation. The first would blow up the Ottoman flagship with his fireboat and the second the vice admiral's flagship. The two fire ships would be accompanied by four Greek vessels that would gather the sailors of the fireboats after the completion of the operation.

Andreas Pipinos tried to burn the rear admiral's flagship, but although some damage was caused, it did not sink, as the crew realized the danger quickly and saw off the fire ship. However, Kanaris managed to affix his fireboat firmly to the flagship, the 84-gun ship of the line Mansur al-liwa. The fire spread to the Ottoman ship and eventually reached the gunpowder hold, resulting in an explosion which destroyed the ship. About two thousand sailors were killed or drowned, including the admiral of the Ottoman navy, Nasuhzade Ali Pasha, who was killed by a falling spar.

See also 
 Burning of the Ottoman flagship off Chios
 Greek War of Independence

References

Sources 
 
 

1788 births
1836 deaths
People from Hydra (island)
Greek people of the Greek War of Independence
18th-century Greek people
19th-century Greek people